This is a list of area codes in Massachusetts:

Massachusetts is split into two main regional (LATA) calling areas: #126 covers the western part, and #128 covers the central and eastern parts.

Eastern Massachusetts has area codes 339, 351, 508, 617, 774, 781, 857, and 978.

Western Massachusetts has area code 413.

See also
 List of NANP area codes
 North American Numbering Plan
 Original North American area codes

References

External links
 

 Detailed map of Massachusetts area codes (pdf)

 
Massachusetts
Area codes